Coma Cinema was an American indie pop band that was formed by Mat Cothran in 2005. Cothran began writing songs for the band during his high school days in Spartanburg, but the band was later based in Asheville, North Carolina.

Coma Cinema's Blue Suicide was released in March 2011, on both cassette (via Wonderbeard Tapes) and vinyl (via Fork and Spoon Records), as well as digitally on the band's website.

History
Cothran began writing songs under the name Coma Cinema early in his teens. After years of performing locally, Cothran released a collection of his recordings in January 2009, entitled Baby Prayers.

Baby Prayers caught the attention of music blogs and websites—including Pitchfork.com, who posted the music video for "Flower Pills" in February 2010. In June 2010, Coma Cinema followed up with their second album, Stoned Alone.

Coma Cinema's third album, Blue Suicide, was released in March 2011 in both digital and physical formats (Wonderbeard Tapes released cassette tapes; Fork and Spoon Records pressed the vinyl). Two tracks off Blue Suicide have already been released in a split 7-inch single with the band Teen Porn through AMDISCS: "Wondering" and "Greater Vultures."

Coma Cinema released their fourth record, Posthumous Release, on June 11, 2013, on cassette tape through Orchid Tapes and on vinyl through Fork and Spoon Records.

Their fifth and final record, titled Loss Memory, was released on December 7, 2017.

Discography

Studio albums
Baby Prayers (2009)
Stoned Alone (2010)
Blue Suicide (2011)
Posthumous Release (2013)
Loss Memory (2017)

Singles
Coma Cinema (split 7-inch) (2010)

Compilations
Bluest of Them All; Anthology (2012)

As Mathew Lee Cothran
Failure (2013)
Failure II (2014)
Judas Hung Himself in America (2017)
My First Love Mends My Final Days (2018)
Condemned to Die in a Carolina Motel Bar (2020)

References

External links
 

American indie pop groups
2005 establishments in South Carolina
Musical groups established in 2005